Sweet 7 is the seventh studio album by British girl group Sugababes, released on 15 March 2010 by Island Records. Production for the album began in April 2009 and was completed in January 2010. Sweet 7 is the only Sugababes album to feature Eurovision Song Contest 2009 entrant Jade Ewen following the controversial departure of Keisha Buchanan in September 2009. As a result of the group line-up change, Sweet 7 was re-recorded to feature the vocals of new member Ewen and for the removal of Buchanan's vocals, making this the only Sugababes album that features none of the original members.

Production on the album began with Buchanan's involvement, who was featured on the lead single "Get Sexy", which peaked at number two in the UK. Following her departure, "About a Girl" and "Wear My Kiss" peaked at number eight and seven, respectively. The album was produced by Jay-Z's entertainment company Roc Nation; the involvement of Roc Nation's in-house producers gave the album a strong electro and dance-pop sound due to work from US producers and writers, mainly Fernando Garibay, Stargate and The Smeezingtons. Despite the high-profile input, Sweet 7 was negatively received by critics, and was awarded a 39 out of 100 according to aggregated reviews at Metacritic. The negative reviews stemmed to the originality of the image due to the loss of Buchanan, as well as a lack of an identifiable sound and soul from the project. 

Sweet 7 peaked at number 14 in the UK and number 35 in Ireland, becoming the group's second-lowest charting album to date in those countries. Promotion for the album ended after the release of the final single so that the group could begin work on a new album, but they split after they released its intended single, "Freedom".

Recording and line-up change
Prior to the album's creation, Sugababes signed a US record deal with Jay-Z's label Roc Nation. The album was recorded by Sugababes mostly in Los Angeles and New York with a couple of sessions in London. The group primarily worked with RedOne, Ryan Tedder, Stargate, Fernando Garibay, and The Smeezingtons. One of the album's tracks, "No More You", was written by Ne-Yo. Keisha Buchanan compared the song to Rihanna's "Hate That I Love You" and "Take a Bow". Buchanan told BBC Radio 1's Newsbeat, the album has "definitely got the British feel throughout the album - we've not gone away and gone 'All American' on our fans." Buchanan continued, "I think it's given us a fresh energy again. I think the one thing we wanted to do was come back with something different." She also admitted the girls had become "complacent" around the time of Catfights and Spotlights but they also said that they are very proud of that album.

After the release of the album's first single "Get Sexy" and just two months before its initial projected November 2009 release, it was reported by the media that Amelle Berrabah had quit the group. Buchanan, however, denied any drama within the group and insisted that Berrabah would remain a member "for the moment". Rumors began circulating that Jade Ewen, the UK's 2009 Eurovision Song Contest entrant, would be joining the group and replacing Berrabah. On 21 September 2009, it was announced that Buchanan had left the band, although she stated via her Twitter account that it was not her decision to leave. Berrabah and fellow member Heidi Range later stated that they both attempted to quit the Sugababes themselves only to find that their group's management decided that they would follow them, rather than find two new members for Buchanan. Buchanan was immediately replaced by Ewen, who immediately began recording her vocals over Buchanan's in preparation for the album's release.

Buchanan reunited with the original Sugababes line-up with former members Mutya Buena and Siobhán Donaghy in 2011, but the trio would not regain the Sugababes name and trademark until 2019. In March 2023, in response to a fan question, Buchanan stated that she would never again perform any of the songs from Sweet 7, but refused to blame Range, Berrabah or any of the songwriters and producers they collaborated with for what she ultimately felt was not true to the Sugababes sound. She expressed relief that the finished album does not feature her vocals or image, but also dismay and embarrassment that she was a part of its development and that the demos for many tracks with her original vocals leaked on the internet.

Songs
"Thank You for the Heartbreak" is an electropop song with a 1980s electro influence. David Balls of Digital Spy described it as a "snappy electropop number", and noted its potential to "have slotted quite nicely" onto Sugababes' fifth studio album, Change (2007). During an interview with Digital Spy, group member Amelle Berrabah stated that "Thank You for the Heartbreak" is amongst the tracks on the album that the Sugababes enjoy, and later named it a potential single from the album. There was a "potential lyrical mashup" with the song's lyric, 'dancing off my tears', on which Heidi Range replied: "If people want to sing that when we perform it, well, we won't complain!" Nick Levine of Digital Spy wrote that the song "displays the Sugababes spunk of old" in comparison to the other "characterless" tracks on the album. David Balls of Digital Spy noted that the song suggests that the Sugababes "extracted maximum benefit from their recording sessions in LA earlier this year", and they did not "stray too far from their comfort zone". Balls also described "Thank You for the Heartbreak", as well as the album's second single "About a Girl", as a track that is both "fresh-sounding" and "packed with the attitude that always made the group stand out." Thomas H Green of The Daily Telegraph listed the song in his "Download this" category. Lauren Murphy of Entertainment Ireland described it as a "minor saving grace" and "very likeable" in comparison to the other "mediocre" tracks on the album.

"She's a Mess" is an uptempo electropop song. Originally called "I'm a Mess", the group decided to retitle it due to concerns that the lyrics (such as "Drinking bottle after bottle / I'm such a mess in that dress / I'm not impressed") encouraged binge drinking. However, Range stated that "there are some lyrics that are quite cheeky but people shouldn't take them seriously." During an interview for Digital Spy, Berrabah described the overall sound of Sweet 7, saying: "It's quite an uptempo album with a lot of different sounds." Berrabah cited "She's a Mess" as an example for this, which she said was "just totally different from everything else." Jon O'Brien of AllMusic wrote that the "aptly named 'She's a Mess' is a chaotic attempt at a Clubland trance-pop floor-filler". Al Fox of the British Broadcasting Corporation called the song, along with the album's third single "Wear My Kiss", a "glimmer of brilliance" and went on to say that it is saved by Berrabah's "unashamed attitude". Christopher Lee of The Scotsman named it one of the better tracks on the album, although admitted that it "wouldn't have sounded much different coming from any other girl band". Nick Levine of Digital Spy wrote that "sisterhood" is being "jettisoned entirely" on the track, which he described as "crass and misogynistic". Celina Murphy of Hot Press suggested that "She's a Mess" "might actually sound quite punchy" if it was recorded by Barbadian recording artist Rihanna.

Critical reception

Sweet 7 received poor reviews from music critics. Aggregating website Metacritic, which assigns a normalised rating out of 100 given to reviews from mainstream critics, gave the album an average score of 39, based on six reviews, which indicates "generally unfavorable reviews".

Jon O'Brien of AllMusic, who gave the album a 2 out of 5 star rating, criticised it as a "bland, soulless, and repetitive affair", while admitting that it "reveals they [Sugababes] are now unrecognizable, not only in terms of personnel, but also in terms of their sound and image". He admitted that although the album is "never short of an infectious hook or club-friendly production", it "undoubtedly betrays the experimental sensibilities that set them apart from their contemporaries." Thomas H Green of The Daily Telegraph gave the album a 3 out of 5 star rating, praising it as "catchy, cod-sexy, hi-NRG cheese that will ensure jammed and joyful school discos and gay club dance floors."

Caroline Sullivan of The Guardian called the album "disappointing" and criticised the band's shift in sound, stating that most of the tracks "are [...] either in thrall to Lady Gaga's robotronic sound" or "just wrong for this particular band", with her gaving the album 2 out of 5 stars. Andy Gill of The Independent gave a notably unfavorable review wherein the album was awarded 1 out of 5 stars. He criticised the group's lack of identity, in particular the loss of founding member Buchanan, writing: "Sugababes finally slipped from being a band to a brand". He went on to say that the "policy of replenishment has eroded both the trio's character and its appeal". Regarding the quality of the album, Gill felt that Sweet 7 contained mostly "generic disco stompers".

Rick Pearson of London Evening Standard wrote that Range, Berrabah and Ewen were unconvincingly "grasping for an identity" on the album, giving it 2 out of 5 stars. Alex Denney of NME awarded it 4 out of 10, writing that Sweet 7 "leaves us hankering after the good old days" and that "time was we could expect more than bland consistency from the Sugababes – shame." Johnny Dee of Virgin Media awarded Sweet 7 2 out of 5 stars; according to him, the Sugababes "have completely lost all vocal character and personality". The Timess Dan Cairns criticised the album's songs and went on to write that the Sugababes in 2010 "are a pale, karaoke imitation of the glory days." Simon Price of The Independent wrote that the group "plays it depressingly safe with substandard electro pop", while reacting negatively to the line-up change, saying: "They [Sugababes] can call themselves what they like, but they'll never fill the heels of Keisha, Mutya and Siobhan. It's over."

Commercial performance
Sweet 7 debuted at number 14 on the UK Albums Chart. It became the Sugababes' lowest-charting album in the country since their 2000 debut album, One Touch. The album dropped 29 places to number 43 in the following week, which was its last appearance in the chart. In Ireland, Sweet 7 peaked at number 35 on the Irish Albums Chart, becoming their second-lowest charting album in that country to date. The album debuted at number 92 on the Swiss Albums Chart, becoming their lowest charting album in that country, excluding Catfights and Spotlights (2008), which failed to chart. Sweet 7 debuted at number five on the Greek International Albums Chart, staying the chart for two weeks.

Singles
"Get Sexy" was released on 31 August 2009 as the album's lead single. It is the last single to feature vocals by founding member Buchanan. Some reviewers praised the song's production and lyrics, while others dismissed it as unoriginal and generic. The song peaked at number two on the UK Singles Chart and number three on the Irish Singles Chart, while also charting on the singles charts in Australia, Austria, Belgium, the Czech Republic, Germany, Sweden and Slovakia.

"About a Girl", the first single to feature vocals by Ewen, was released as the album's second single on 8 November 2009. The single peaked at number eight on the UK Singles Chart and inside the top twenty on the Irish Singles Chart.

"Wear My Kiss" was released as the third and final single from Sweet 7 on 22 February 2010, three weeks prior to the album's release. It went top-ten in the UK and Ireland at numbers seven and nine, respectively.

Track listingNotes  signifies a co-producer
  signifies an additional producerSample credits"Get Sexy" contains an interpolation of the 1991 song "I'm Too Sexy" by the band Right Said Fred.

Personnel
Track listing and credits taken from Sweet 7 liner notes.VisualsStudioBOWDEN – art directionVocal and performance creditsCarlos Battey & Steven Battey – background vocals
Amelle Berrabah – lead vocals, background vocals
Keisha Buchanan - background vocals
Jade Ewen – lead vocals, background vocals
Sean Kingston – guest vocals

Philip Lawrence – background vocals
Ari Levin – background vocals
Bruno Mars – background vocals
Heidi Range – lead vocals, background vocalsTechnical'

Marcus John Bryant – vocal producer, recording
Daniel Davidsen – guitar
Kevin "KD" Davis – mixer
Richard Edgeler – assistant (for additional production/mixing)
Matt Foster – recording
Fernando Garibay – producer, programming, arrangement
Josh Houghkirk – assistant
Jonas Jeberg – producer, vocal producer, instrumentation, recording
Crystal "Cristyle" Johnson – vocal producer
Martin "Martin K" Kleveland – producer, instrumentation
Philip Lawrence – vocal producer (additional - "About a Girl")
Ari Levine – mixer, instrumentation, recording
Damien Lewis – engineer
Bruno Mars – musician
Mads Nilsson – mixer

AJ Nunez – assistant mixer
Robert Orton – mixer
Carlos Oyanedel – engineer
Derek Pacuk – recording
Dave Pensado – mixer
Reggie "Syience" Perry – producer
Nadir "RedOne" Khayat – engineer, instrumentation, programming, vocal editor
Makeba Riddick – vocal producer
Johnny Severin – engineer, vocal editor
Shaffer "Ne-Yo" Smith – co-producer
Tor Hermansen, Mikkel S. Erikson (Stargate) – producers, instrumentation
Mike Stevens – vocal producer (additional)
Bernt Rune Stray – writer, guitar
Phil Tan – mixer
Jeremy Wheatley – vocal mixer (additional)

Charts

Release history

References

2010 albums
Albums produced by Stargate
Albums produced by the Smeezingtons
Albums produced by Fernando Garibay
Albums produced by RedOne
Electropop albums
Island Records albums
Sugababes albums